Benjamin Psaume (born 12 January 1985) is a French professional footballer who plays for RCO Agde.

Club career
He signed for Troyes AC in January 2011 from Arles-Avignon, then in Ligue 1, and helped them avoid relegation in Ligue 2 that season. The following season, he helped them gain promotion to Ligue 1. He re-signed for Arles-Avignon in the 2012–13 season.

External links
 https://www.lequipe.fr/Football/FootballFicheJoueur21854.html

1985 births
Living people
French footballers
Association football forwards
Ligue 1 players
Ligue 2 players
Toulouse FC players
FC Sète 34 players
Nîmes Olympique players
US Boulogne players
AC Arlésien players
ES Troyes AC players